Tahquitz may refer to:

Culture
 Tahquitz (spirit), a legendary spirit of the Cahuilla and Luiseño Native American people of Southern California
Tahquitz, a musical score by Fannie Charles Dillon
Tahquitz, a sound installation work by Lewis deSoto

Places
 Tahquitz Canyon, a canyon in Palm Springs, California
 Tahquitz Creek, the creek that runs through Tahquitz Canyon
 Tahquitz Falls, a waterfall within Tahquitz Canyon
 Tahquitz High School, a school in Hemet, California
 Tahquitz Peak, a peak in southern California's San Jacinto Mountains
 Tahquitz Rock, a granite outcrop on the side of Tahquitz Peak
 Red Tahquitz, a secondary peak, red in color, nearby Tahquitz peak